Frederick II ( – 10 October 1213) was the Duke of Lorraine from 7 April 1206 until his death in 1213. He was the son of Frederick I, Duke of Lorraine and Wierzchoslawa Ludmilla of Greater Poland. He succeeded his father as Duke of Lorraine upon his father's death.

He married Agnes (or Thomassine, according to different genealogies) (d. 1226), daughter of Theobald I, Count of Bar. Their children were: 
 Theobald I, Duke of Lorraine (b. c. 1191, d. 17 February 1220), his successor
 Matthias II, Duke of Lorraine (b. c. 1193, d. 9 February 1251), who succeeded Theobald I
 Jacques, Bishop of Metz
 Renaut, Count of Castres
 Lorette, who married Simon II.

See also
Dukes of Lorraine family tree

References

1160s births
1213 deaths
Year of birth uncertain
Dukes of Lorraine